Tarek Anthony Jabre is a film producer and financier. He is best known for his work on Heist, Silence and Boiling Point.

Education 
Tarek Anthony Jabre attended Royal Holloway University of London, where he acquired a Bachelor's of Art in French with Business Management, before beginning his career in finance, dealing with FX currency trading, portfolio management, and private clients' funds.

Career 
Based in Geneva, Paris, and London, Tarek Anthony Jabre worked alongside firms such as UBS, Credit Suisse, Credit Agricole, Merrill Lynch, and Prudential Bache.

In 2012 Tarek Anthony Jabre turned his expertise towards film producing/financing, and founded Vedette Finance's Feature Film division, a film development and finance company, which is based in Los Angeles.

Tarek Anthony Jabre has executively produced a diverse range of films. Earlier releases include The Angriest Man in Brooklyn, starring Robin Williams, Mila Kunis, and Melissa Leo; The Face of an Angel, starring Kate Beckinsale, Daniel Bruhl, and Cara Delevingne, and Heist, starring Robert De Niro, Dave Bautista, and Jeffrey Dean Morgan. More recent films include, Martin Scorsese's Silence, starring Liam Neeson, Adam Driver, and Andrew Garfield; Aftermath, starring Arnold Schwarzenegger; and Gotti starring John Travolta.

Other projects on Jabre’s new film slate, include Boiling Point, starring the award-winning, highly acclaimed actor Stephen Graham, who was recently in Martin Scorsese’s The Irishman. It is a feature-length version of the short film which was nominated for Best British Short at the 2019 British Independent Film Awards. The project was written and directed by Philip Barantini, who is also set to direct the feature. Boiling Point is about a chef, played by Stephen Graham, who tries to keep his restaurant functioning on the busiest day of the year in the run-up to Christmas. Other actors include Jason Flemyng, Vinette Robinson and Ray Panthaki.

Also in production is the prison drama ‘A Violent Man' which marks Ross McCall's directorial debut, starring Craig Fairbrass, Stephen Odubola, and Jason Flemyng, and tells the story of life in prison for Steve (Fairbrass), who is incarcerated for double murder. We follow as he navigates his struggle against redemption, the system, and his inner turmoil.

Films In Development 
Films in development include, Pony, written by Oscar nominated writer Jonathan Herman, co-writer of Straight Outta Compton, and Scarface remake writer. The project is about a man who will stop at nothing to find his 16 year-old son's killers. In the process he looks for revenge, but also finds the strength to forgive and become a better person. Tarek Anthony Jabre is set to produce alongside veteran producer Bob Cooper, of Landscape Entertainment.

Other films in development include 14 Fists a film about a Chinese family living on a British council estate who is terrorized by a local gang until they take in a mysterious drifter. The film is set to star BAFTA-nominated John Hannah (Four Weddings and a Funeral, Agents of S.H.I.E.L.D.) Bai Ling (The Crow, Crank 2: High Voltage) Jean-Paul Ly, whose credits include the critically acclaimed Nightshooters, and the award-winning Cambodian martial arts film Jailbreak.

Filmography 
 2010 Siren
 2013 Enter The Dangerous Mind
 2014 The Angriest Man in Brooklyn
 2014 The Prince
 2014 The Face of an Angel
 2015 Vice
 2015 Heist
 2015 Extraction
 2016 Precious Cargo
 2016 Marauders
 2016 Silence
 2017 Aftermath
 2018 London Fields
 2018 The Life and Death of John Gotti
 2021 Boiling Point
 2022 A Violent Man
 14 Fists (In Development)
 Pony (In Development)

References

External links 
 
 Vedette Finance website

Living people
American film producers
20th-century American businesspeople
Year of birth missing (living people)